Josef Schnyder (January 12, 1923 – March 2, 2017) was a Swiss cross-country skier who competed in the 1950s. At the 1952 Winter Olympics in Oslo, he finished 37th in the 18 km event and 20th in the 50 km event.

References
18 km Olympic cross country results: 1948-52
Olympic 50 km cross country skiing results: 1948-64
Mention of Josef Schnyder's death

Olympic cross-country skiers of Switzerland
Cross-country skiers at the 1952 Winter Olympics
Swiss male cross-country skiers
1923 births
2017 deaths